WVRQ (1360 AM) is a radio station broadcasting an oldies format. Licensed to Viroqua, Wisconsin, United States, the station serves the La Crosse area.  The station is currently owned by Robinson Corporation and features programming from ABC Radio, ESPN Radio and Westwood One. Original call letters were WISV.

References

External links

VRQ
Oldies radio stations in the United States
Radio stations established in 1958
1958 establishments in Wisconsin